The 2013 Jelajah Malaysia, a cycling stage race that took place in Malaysia. It was held from 26 to 30 June 2013. There were five stages with a total of 856.1 kilometres. In fact, the race was sanctioned by the Union Cycliste Internationale as a 2.2 category race and was part of the 2012–13 UCI Asia Tour calendar.

Loh Sea Keong of Malaysia won the race, followed by Sergey Kuzmin of Kazakhstan second and Kiril Pozdnyakov of Russia third overall. Mohamed Harrif Salleh of Malaysia won the points classification and Mohamed Zamri Salleh of Malaysia won the mountains classification. Synergy Baku Cycling Project won the team classification.

Stages

Classification leadership

Stage results

Stage 1
26 June 2013 — National Sports Complex, Bukit Jalil to Rembau,

Stage 2
27 June 2013 — Rembau to Batu Pahat,

Stage 3
28 June 2013 — Batu Pahat to Pontian,

Stage 4
29 June 2013 — Plaza Angsana, Johor Bahru to Bukit Katil, Malacca,

Stage 5
30 June 2013 — Bukit Katil, Malacca to Putra Square, Putrajaya,

Final standings

General classification

Points classification

Mountains classification

Team classification

Asian rider classification

Asian team classification

Malaysian rider classification

Malaysian team classification

List of teams and riders
A total of 20 teams were invited to participate in the 2013 Jelajah Malaysia. Out of 116 riders, a total of 107 riders made it to the finish in Putra Square, Putrajaya.

 
  Mohamed Harrif Salleh
  Mohamed Zamri Salleh
  Mohd Saiful Anuar Aziz
  Mohd Shahrul Mat Amin
  Yusrizal Usoff
  Nur Amirul Fakhruddin Marzuki
 Synergy Baku Cycling Project
  John Kronborg Ebsen
  Kiril Pozdnyakov
  Samir Jabrayilov
  Aqshin Ismayilov
  Tural Isgandarov
  Elchin Asadov
 CCN Cycling Team
  Lex Nederlof
  Caleb Jones
  Wang Yin-Chih
  Robert Gitelis
  Fito Bakdo Prilanji
  Hari Fitrianto
 
  Anthony Giacoppo
  Jack Beckinsale
  Aaron Donnelly
  Samuel Davis (cyclist)
  Brenton Jones
  Tom Robinson
 Matrix Powertag
  Mariusz Wiesiak
  Kazushige Kuboki
  Kim Do-Hyeong
  Naoki Mukaigawa
  Sota Ikebe
 OCBC Singapore Continental Cycling Team
  Ahmad Haidar Anuawar
  Low Ji Wen
  Ho Jun Rong
  Goh Choon Huat
  Jason Christie
  Loh Sea Keong

 Team 7 Eleven Presented By Roadbike Philippines
  Ronnel Hualda
  Jonipher Ravina
  Galedo Mark Lexer
  John Mark Camingao
  Jerry Aquino Jr.
 LBC-MVPSF Cycling Pilipinas
  Ronald Oranza
  Rustom Lim
  El Joshua Carino
  Jemico Brioso
  Junrey A Navarra
  Denver Casayuran
 Polygon Sweet Nice Team
  Edgar Nohales Nieto
  Dealton Nur Arif Prayoga
  Agung Riyanto
  Jimmy Pranata
  Antonius Christopher Tjondrokusumo
  Sergey Kuzmin
 Malaysia National Cycling Team
  Ahmad Fakhrullah Alias
  Ahmad Fahmi Farhan Ahmad Fuat
  Muhd Nasrullah Ismanizam
  Muhamad Rauf Nur Misbah
  Adiq Husainie Othman
  Shahrin Amir
 Bahrain National Cycling Team
  Mansoor Mohamed
  Maki Hussain Mohammed
  Ismail Isa Ayoob
  Alawi Sayed Ahmed Khalil
  Adnan Taha Sayed Alawi
  Salman Ali Abdul Abbas

 Singapore National Cycling Team
  Ang Kee Meng
  Syed Amir Haziq Syed Ahmad
  Joel Foo Yuan Sheng
  Alan Soh Yoong Han
  Danny Feng
 Team Putra Perjuangan Bandung Indonesia
  Elan Riyadi
  Chelly Aristya
  Tonton Susanto
  Arin Iswana
  Suherman Haryadi
  Rastra Patria Dinawan
 Customs Cycling Club
  Endre Wijaya
  Agung Ali Sahbana
  Heksa Priya Prasetya
  Muhamad Nur Fathoni
  Aldi Apriani
  Jefri Irawan
 Negeri Sembilan State Cycling Team
  Mohammad Fairet Rusli
  Amirul Anuar Jefri
  Mohd Ekbar Zamanhuri
  Abdul Rashid Ibrahim
  Muhamad Zul Ashraf Zamlan
  Muhamad Nur Syafiq Suhaimy
 Terengganu State Cycling Team
  Ahmad Fallanie Ali
  Mohd Fahmi Irfan Zailani
  M. Iskandar Fitri Ahmad Sabti
  Mohd Syazwan Alif Zaidy
  Mohamad Asmui Ali Awang
  Mohd Shahrazy Mohd Fuad

 Majlis Sukan Negara
  Sofian Nabil Omar Mohd Bakri
  Hamdann Hamidun
  Wan Shazwan Afiq Wan Shahril Anwar
  Mohammad Al-Ghazali Hamid
  Muhamad Zawawi Azman
  Muhammed Syafiq Syazwan Zainuddin
 ATM Cycling Team
  Mohd Nor Rizuan Zainal
  Mohd Fadzli Anuar Mohd Fauzi
  Muhammad Elmi Jumari
  Mohd Shahrul Afiza Fauizan
  Muhammad Azman Shahudin
  Mohd Shahrul Nizam Che Samsudin
 PDRM Cycling Team
  Mohd Fauzan Ahmad Lutfi
  Nik Mohd Azwan Zulkifle
  Mohamad Faris Abdul Razak
  Mohd Salahuddin Mat Saman
  Azmirul Hafeez Aziz
 Team Corbusier
  Syelvester Ding
  Laurel Lauridsen Adrian
  Mohamad Azrul Taufiq Annuar
  Ahmad Firdaus Abdul Karim
  Daniel Bonello
  Paul Van Der Ploeg

External links
 
 Palmares at cyclingarchives.com
 2013 Jelajah Malaysia at procyclingstats.com

Jelajah Malaysia
Jelajah Malaysia
Jelajah Malaysia, 2013